Ejlert Bjerke (14 March 1887 – 25 September 1963) was a Norwegian novelist, poet, playwright and essayist. He was born in Oslo, and made his literary debut in 1909 with the short story collection Mennesker og fauner. A second collection, Frie Fugle, was published in 1910. Among his novels are Livsfyrsten from 1914 and Sværmere i solen from 1917. His essay collection Molok was published in 1920, and the travelogue Tre horisonter in 1929. He was father of André Bjerke.

References

1887 births
1963 deaths
Writers from Oslo
20th-century Norwegian novelists
20th-century Norwegian poets
Norwegian male poets
Norwegian essayists
Norwegian travel writers
Norwegian male novelists
Norwegian male dramatists and playwrights
20th-century Norwegian dramatists and playwrights
Male essayists
20th-century essayists
20th-century Norwegian male writers